This article is a list of the correspondents and on-screen contributors who have appeared on the satirical television program The Daily Show.  Correspondents, collectively known as "The World's Fakest News Team" (formerly known as "The Best F#@king News Team Ever"), normally have two roles: "experts" with satirical "senior" titles whom the host interviews about certain issues, or hosts of original reporting segments, which often showcase interviews of serious political figures. During Jon Stewart's tenure, the show's contributors often had their own unique recurring segment on the show and tended to appear less frequently; current host Trevor Noah is a former correspondent and contributor who was featured during the Stewart era.

Current cast

Correspondents

Contributors

Former cast

Hosts

Recurring correspondents

Contributors

Timeline chart

References

External links
 The Daily Show with Trevor Noah official website

Daily Show correspondents
The Daily Show